Evinrude may refer to:
Evinrude Outboard Motors, a company that builds outboard motors for boats
The dragonfly in the 1977 Disney animated film The Rescuers
 Ole Evinrude (1877–1934), Norwegian-American inventor, founder of Evinrude Outboard Motors
 Ralph Evinrude (1907–1986), American businessman